No. 224 Squadron RAF was a Royal Air Force squadron that saw service in both the First and Second World Wars.

History

It was formed on 1 April 1918, at Alimini, Italy from part of No. 6 Wing RNAS, equipped with the de Havilland DH.4. In June 1918 it re-equipped with the de Havilland DH.9. The squadron moved to Taranto in December 1918, disbanding there in May 1919.

 
On 1 February 1937, the squadron reformed at Manston, when No. 48 Squadron was renumbered.  It then moved to Boscombe Down and was equipped with Avro Ansons for reconnaissance duties. In August 1938 the squadron moved to Leuchars, and from May 1939 began re-equipping with the Lockheed Hudson.

The squadron moved to Limavady in April 1941, and St Eval in December 1941. In February 1942 it returned to Limavady and moved to Tiree in April 1942 where it converted to Consolidated Liberators. In September 1942 the squadron moved; first to Beaulieu, then St Eval in April 1943, and Milltown,  Scotland in September 1944.
224 Squadron was a successful anti-submarine unit, accounting for twelve U-boats destroyed during the Second World War. 
The squadron returned to St Eval in July 1945 where it converted to Avro Lancasters in October 1946. The squadron disbanded on 10 November 1947.

The squadron reformed on 1 March 1948 at RAF Aldergrove, equipped with the Handley Page Halifax. In 1951 it re-equipped with the Avro Shackleton, which it operated from RAF Gibraltar from August 1951, until disbanding on 31 October 1966. During this period its main tasks were NATO maritime surveillance as well as search and rescue duties within the Gibraltar Maritime Area. This area covered a large part of the eastern Atlantic as well as the western Mediterranean.

Aircraft operated
 1918-1919 Airco DH.4
 1918-1919 Airco DH.9
 1937-1939 Avro Anson I
 1939-1941 Lockheed Hudson I
 1941-1942 Lockheed Hudson III and V
 1942-1943 Consolidated Liberator II & III
 1943-1944 Consolidated Liberator V
 1944-1945 Consolidated Liberator VI
 1945-1946 Consolidated Liberator VIII
 1946-1947 Avro Lancaster GR3
 1948-1952 Handley Page Halifax GR6
 1951-1954 Avro Shackleton MR1
 1953-1966 Avro Shackleton MR2

References

External links

224
Military units and formations disestablished in 1966